Sphaerocarpales is an order of plants within the liverworts.  Approximately twenty species are in this order which is sub-divided into four families: Monocarpaceae, Sphaerocarpaceae and Riellaceae, as well as the extinct family Naiaditaceae. The inclusion of the Naiaditaceae is uncertain, and the family has sometimes been assigned to the Calobryales.

Classification 
Living taxa and species count based on Söderström et al. 2016 and synonyms from Collection of genus-group names in a systematic arrangement.
 Monocarpaceae D.J.Carr ex Schelpe 1969
 Monocarpus  D.J.Carr 1956 non Post & Kuntze 1903 [Carrpos Proskauer 1961] 
 Riellaceae Engl. 1892
 Austroriella Cargill & J.Milne2013
 Riella Mont. 1852 [Duriaea Bory De St. Vincent & Montagne 1843 non Durieua Merat 1829; Maisonneuvea Trevisan 1877; Duriella Bory de St. Vincent ex Billot 1861] (about 18 spp.)
 Sphaerocarpaceae Heeg 1891
 Geothallus Campb. 1896  [Geocarpus Goebel 1915 non Kinkelin 1884] (1 species)
 Sphaerocarpos Boehm. 1760 non Gmelin 1791 [Sphaerocarpus (sic) Adanson 1763] (8 or 9 spp.)
 †Naiaditaceae Schuster 1980 nominum invalidum
 †Naiadita lanceolata Brodie 1845

References

External links 
 
 

 
Liverwort orders